Brian Bates may refer to:

 Brian Bates (psychologist) (born 1944), British professor of psychology and writer
 Brian Bates (soccer) (born 1972), American soccer defender
 Brian Bates (footballer) (born 1944), English winger